Al-Rayyan is a village in central Syria, administratively part of the Homs Governorate, located southeast of Homs. Nearby localities include Sakrah to the north, al-Haraki to the northeast, al-Sayyid to the east, al-Riqama to the southeast, Judaydat al-Sharqiyah to the southwest, Maskanah to the west and Zaidal and Fairouzeh to the northwest. According to the Syria Central Bureau of Statistics (CBS), al-Rayyan had a population of 4,876 in the 2004 census.

References

Populated places in Homs District